General elections were held in Anguilla on 4 March 1999. The result was a victory for the ruling coalition of the Anguilla United Party and the Anguilla Democratic Party, each winning 2 seats.  The opposition Anguilla National Alliance won 3 seats.  However, the coalition government lost its majority in May 1999 upon the resignation of Victor Banks, the Finance Minister and leader of the Anguilla Democratic Party.  Due to the collapse of the ruling coalition, fresh elections were held in March 2000.

Results

References 

Elections in Anguilla
Anguilla
General election
Anguilla
March 1999 events in North America